The Eternal leaders of North Korea, officially the Eternal leaders of Juche Korea, refers to the practice of granting posthumous titles to deceased leaders of North Korea. The official title was established by a line in the preamble to the Constitution, as amended on 30 June 2016, and in subsequent revisions.

It reads (in the original version):

History of the title

Presidency of North Korea before 1994

The post of "President of the Democratic People's Republic of Korea" was established in the Constitution of North Korea in 1972. Until then, Kim Il-sung held the posts of premier and general secretary of the Workers' Party of Korea.

In 1972, the presidency was established, and Kim Il-sung was elected to the position by the Supreme People's Assembly, the North Korean legislature, on 28 December 1972. Kim served as president until 1994 when he died, and the position was left vacant and his son and successor Kim Jong-il was not given the title.

"Eternal President" 

The revised constitution in 1998 abolished the presidency and declared Kim Il-sung "eternal President".

The preamble of the Constitution of the Democratic People's Republic of Korea as amended on 5 September 1998 reads:

The president was the de jure head of state of North Korea, but whose powers were exercised by the "sacred leader" of the nation's state ideology called Juche. According to Ashley J. Tellis and Michael Wills, this amendment to the preamble was an indication of the unique North Korean characteristic of being a theocratic state based on the personality cult surrounding Kim Il-sung. In addition, North Korea adopted a Juche calendar dating from 1912, the year of Kim Il-sung's birth.

The 2012 Constitution once again referred to Kim Il-sung as the "eternal President of the Democratic People's Republic of Korea".

"Eternal General Secretary" / "Eternal Chairman" 

After the death of Kim Jong-il, the constitution was amended in 2012, declaring him Eternal General Secretary of the Workers' Party of Korea and Eternal Chairman of the National Defence Commission. The title of party leader was changed to "first secretary", although in 2021 it was renamed "General Secretary".

In 2016, the title "eternal leaders of Juche Korea" was introduced by amending the preamble of the constitution, which was given to Kim Il-sung and Kim Jong-il.

Head of state role in North Korea after the deaths of Kim Il-sung and Kim Jong-il 
The functions and powers previously belonging to the president were divided between numerous officials: the premier of North Korea; the chairman of the Supreme People's Assembly, chairman of the Standing Committee of the Supreme People's Assembly; and the head of the military, the chairman of the National Defence Commission (replaced by State Affairs Commission of North Korea in 2016) and supreme commander of the Korean People's Army. These positions are currently held by Kim Tok-hun, Choe Ryong-hae, and Kim Jong-un respectively.

See also 

Death and state funeral of Kim Il-sung
Death and state funeral of Kim Jong-il
Absolute monarchy
Imperial cult
Kim dynasty (North Korea)
Kim Il-sung bibliography
List of things named after Kim Il-sung
North Korean cult of personality
Political religion
President for Life
Propaganda in North Korea
Sacred king
Vice President of North Korea

References

Bibliography

1998 in North Korea
Government of North Korea
Kim Il-sung
Kim Jong-il
Posthumous recognitions